The Vicariate Apostolic of Camiri is a Latin Church missionary ecclesiastical territory or apostolic vicariate of the Catholic Church in Bolivia. Its cathedra is found in the Cathedral of St. Francis of Assisi in the episcopal see of Camiri.

History
On 22 May 1919 Pope Benedict XV established the Vicariate Apostolic of Chaco from the Diocese of Santa Cruz de la Sierra. The name of the vicariate has subsequently been changed twice. Pope Pius XII changed the name to the Vicariate Apostolic of Cuevo in 1951 and John Paul II gave it its present name in 2003.

Leadership
Ippolito Ulivelli, O.F.M. † (13 August 1919 – 27 October 1922) Died
César Angel Vigiani, O.F.M. † (21 January 1924 – 23 January 1950) Resigned
Cesar Francesco Benedetti, O.F.M. † (8 February 1951 – 18 December 1972) Resigned
Giovanni Décimo Pellegrini, O.F.M. † (18 December 1972 – 31 October 1992) Died
Leonardo Mario Bernacchi, O.F.M. † (17 November 1993 – 15 July 2009) Resigned
Francisco Focardi Mazzocchi, O.F.M. † (15 July 2009 – 2 August 2017) Resigned
Jesús Galeote Tormo, O.F.M. (22 February 2019 – present)

See also
Roman Catholicism in Bolivia

Sources

Apostolic vicariates
Roman Catholic dioceses in Bolivia
Christian organizations established in 1919
Roman Catholic ecclesiastical provinces in Bolivia